The Servet Tazegül Arena is a multi-purpose indoor arena located at Yenişehir district of Mersin, Turkey, named in honor of the Olympic, world and European champion taekwondo practitioner Servet Tazegül (born 1988).

The construction of the building began on January 20, 2012 with the laying of foundation stone. The arena is one of the eleven new-built sports venues in Mersin to host the 2013 Mediterranean Games.With its seating capacity of 7,500, it is one of the biggest indoor arenas in Turkey.
It is situated to the south of Mersin Tennis Complex.

2013 Mediterranean Games
At 2013 Mediterranean Games, the arena hosted basketball  event (men)  between 17–25 June and volleyball semifinal and final events (women and men) between 27–30 June.

References

Indoor arenas in Turkey
Basketball venues in Turkey
Volleyball venues in Turkey
Sports venues in Mersin
Sports venues completed in 2013
2013 Mediterranean Games venues
Yenişehir, Mersin